Deuterocohnia chrysantha is a plant species in the genus Deuterocohnia. This species is endemic to Chile.

References
Chilean Bromeliaceae: diversity, distribution and evaluation of conservation status (Published online: 10 March 2009)

chrysantha
Endemic flora of Chile